Daryl Thomas (May 25, 1965 – March 28, 2018) was an American basketball player and coach from Chicago, Illinois.

High school career
Thomas, a 6'7" forward, played high school basketball at Chicago-area St. Joseph High School in Westchester, Illinois, the same school that Isiah Thomas (no relation) had attended. He was both a McDonald's and Parade All-American in 1983.

College career
Thomas was a starter for Indiana University under coach Bobby Knight from 1983 to 1987 scoring 1,095 points.  Thomas was co-captain of the Indiana Hoosiers men's basketball team that won the 1987 NCAA Division I men's basketball tournament.  Thomas scored 20 points and notably made the pass to Keith Smart, whose buzzer-beating shot gave the Hoosiers a one-point victory over Syracuse. Knight called Thomas' decision to pass the ball to Smart, who had a better shot, "the greatest single play I ever had a kid make."

Professional career
The Sacramento Kings selected Thomas as the 120th pick in the 1987 NBA draft.  He did not make the team and instead played professionally for 13 seasons in the UK, Poland and Dominican Republic. He also played one season in the Continental Basketball Association (CBA), splitting time with the Fargo-Moorhead Fever and La Crosse Catbirds in the 1992–93 CBA season.

Coaching career and death
In later years Thomas was a basketball coach at Montini Catholic High School near Chicago.  Thomas died of a heart attack on March 28, 2018.

References 

1965 births
2018 deaths
20th-century African-American sportspeople
21st-century African-American sportspeople
African-American basketball players
American expatriate basketball people in the Dominican Republic
American expatriate basketball people in Poland
American expatriate basketball people in the United Kingdom
American men's basketball coaches
American men's basketball players
Basketball players from Chicago
Centers (basketball)
Fargo-Moorhead Fever players
High school basketball coaches in the United States
Indiana Hoosiers men's basketball players
La Crosse Catbirds players
McDonald's High School All-Americans
Parade High School All-Americans (boys' basketball)
Power forwards (basketball)
Sportspeople from Chicago